U.S. Agent (John Walker) is a character appearing in American comic books published by Marvel Comics, usually those starring Captain America and the Avengers. Created by Mark Gruenwald and Paul Neary, the character first appeared in Captain America #323 (November 1986) as Super-Patriot. He was later redesigned as an incarnation of Captain America and a few years later, as U.S. Agent.

Wyatt Russell portrays John Walker in the Marvel Cinematic Universe, starting with the streaming television series The Falcon and the Winter Soldier (2021) and will reprise the role in Thunderbolts (2024).

Publication history
The character of John Walker was first introduced as the supervillain Super-Patriot in Captain America #323 (November 1986). Mark Gruenwald created Walker to counter the general message in Captain America of patriotism being invariably good, describing him as someone "who embodied patriotism in a way that Captain America didn't—a patriotic villain." He said, "Basically, I just wanted to do the opposite of Steve Rogers. Okay, Steve Rogers is a poor northern urban boy. So I'll make a guy from rural middle-class south. Cap is now old, so this guy'll be a real young up-and-comer. Cap has lofty ideals, so I'll make Super-Patriot be more realistic and more pragmatic. So, I put together his background and character traits by playing the opposite game."

This character is the second Super-Patriot character in the Marvel Universe. The first Super-Patriot debuted in Nick Fury: Agent of S.H.I.E.L.D. #13 in July 1969 and never appeared again. The original Super-Patriot's costume bears no resemblance to that used by John Walker.

After a return appearance in Captain America #327, Gruenwald reintroduced the character as the new Captain America in Captain America #333. Though Gruenwald said he would not have done this if it had not been a logical development from the preceding storylines, he also openly acknowledged that the motivating reason for replacing Steve Rogers as Captain America was to boost sales:

With Iron Man, for example, we had James Rhodes take the lead character's place, and we did it for two years—which I'm sure was about a year and a half longer than anybody thought we would do it. In Thor we had Beta Ray Bill take Thor's place for two or three issues. So, this is the sort of thing that has been done to shake up people before. You know, I'm responsible for it in Iron Man and I was editor of Thor at the time of Beta Ray Bill, and believe me it's a trick I know works because I've seen it work a number of times. It's just to get you noticed so that people who don't normally read it will say, "Oh, I heard something about this, let me read it and see." And with luck, folks will get hooked on the storyline.

In having Steve Rogers quit as Captain America and John Walker take over the role, Gruenwald stated that he was hoping to "better define what Captain America the concept is by seeing someone groping, trying to live up to it, trying to grasp all the facets of the concept". Walker soon developed a following of his own, with Gruenwald admitting that his best selling cover of the comic was #321 which had an image of Captain America shooting a firearm, and that this resulted in many fans wanted him to "Rambo-ize" Cap and make him more Punisher or Wolverine-like. Gruenwald considered this a violation of the character's principles, so decided that he would give the fans what they wanted but that it couldn't be Steve Rogers. Walker's popularity as a character continued to grow, with Gruenwald stating that he had letters from readers saying that they didn't want Steve Rogers to ever return as they saw Walker - regardless of his faults - as more viable, younger, and more interesting because they didn't know what he would do next.

John Walker's installation as Captain America indeed provided a major boost to the series's sales, and he remained the main character of Captain America for issues 333 through 350, during which his character generally became more heroic. In Captain America #354 he was given another name and costume change, this time as U.S. Agent (created by writer Mark Gruenwald and artist Kieron Dwyer) using a discarded costume of Steve Rogers (the original Captain America): a black outfit with a different alignment of the stars and stripes to differentiate it from Steve Rogers' suit.

Like some West Coast Avengers teammates who had their own series (such as Iron Man, or Hawkeye in Solo Avengers), the character U.S. Agent was popular enough to support his own limited series in 1993. The mini-series was used to finish off a long-standing Marvel Universe plot thread involving the Scourge of the Underworld.

During the events of the "Maximum Security" storyline, U.S. Agent was given a new uniform reminiscent of riot police uniforms. He continued to use that uniform in his 2001 miniseries, which followed the events in "Maximum Security" and was written and drawn by Jerry Ordway.

"American Zealot"
In August 2020, Marvel announced that U.S. Agent would be getting a five-issue mini-series to be released in November that year, written by Christopher Priest and illustrated by Stefano Landini.

Priest described the story—titled "American Zealot"—as "a morality play in five acts". He continued:

Fictional character biography

Origin

John Walker was born in the fictional town of Custer's Grove, Georgia. He grew up idolizing his older brother, Mike, a helicopter pilot who died in the Vietnam War in 1974. John wanted to live up to Mike's memory, who was idolized by their parents, and so he later enlisted in the military. John served at Fort Bragg, but only served during peacetime and thus never became the hero that he perceived Mike to have been.

After John received an honorable discharge from the United States Army, he was told by a friend about the Power Broker, a mysterious individual who gave people superhuman abilities. Walker and his friend received treatments that granted superhuman abilities.

Super-Patriot

Walker, now in debt to the Power Broker, intends to join the Unlimited Class Wrestling Federation but meets Ethan Thurm who becomes his manager and persuades Walker to become a hero instead. Thurm secures financial backing, helps Walker design a costume, and sets out a strategy that allows him to debut as the corporate-sponsored Super-Patriot who then travels the country promoting his image to the nation through patriotic rallies and community service.

At a rally in Central Park, he holds a secretly rehearsed performance in which he publicly criticizes Captain America and is subsequently attacked by three extremist supporters called the Bold Urban Commandos or "Buckies". Walker defeats the Buckies in the staged fight as a demonstration of his combat prowess and patriotism. Steve Rogers confronts Walker privately afterwards and demands that he stop using the Buckies, since people attending the rally could have been hurt in a panic resulting from the staged attack. Walker refuses, arguing that his actions are justified by his quest to replace the outdated Captain America as the nation's symbol.

When Captain America repeatedly refuses his challenges to a fight, Super-Patriot attacks Captain America. Although Captain America proves to be a more skilled fighter and lands blow after blow, the trash-talking Walker manages to absorb the attacks. With neither man falling after a lengthy brawl, Super-Patriot flings a number of throwing stars at Captain America who is too tired to dodge. One hits in the chest, embedding into Captain America's uniform but doing little to no actual physical damage. With the successful strike, the gleeful Super-Patriot claims victory and promptly departs. The weary and dejected Captain America tries to tell himself that the fight was a draw, as neither man actually went down but is nonetheless left questioning his own fighting abilities while acknowledging Super-Patriot's superior strength and stamina.

Walker catches the eye of the nation though when he tackles the terrorist Warhead who threatens to detonate a nuclear weapon in Washington, D.C. atop the Washington Monument. Walker scales the monument, disarming Warhead with a throwing star, before sending Warhead plummeting to the ground below. Warhead—preferring to go out 'like a man'—kills himself before hitting the ground by detonating a hand grenade.

This high-profile act makes him an instant celebrity, appearing in The Washington Post and on national television where he claims himself to be "America's future", which in turn brings him to the attention of Valerie Cooper in her role as a Presidential advisor.

Captain America
Soon after, Steve Rogers abandons Captain America's costume and identity when ordered to report directly to the Commission on Superhuman Activities, feeling that Captain America had grown beyond the name's original role as a symbol of America during the war and not wanting to be tied down to a political agenda. The Commission debates who should be the new Captain America, with Nick Fury and Sam Wilson both being considered as candidates, although it was considered that the former was too old and would not want to give up the autonomy enjoyed as Director of S.H.I.E.L.D, where as in the case of the latter they did not believe that the United States was ready for a black equivalent.

Dr. Valerie Cooper, a member of the Commission, suggests that Walker should be made the new Captain America as a U.S. government operative. Though repulsed by the notion of giving up being Super-Patriot and taking on the Captain America identity he has criticized so much, Walker ultimately answers, "Ma'am, if Uncle Sam wanted me to be Mickey Mouse, I'd do it." As Captain America, he is forced to abandon Thrum as his manager, and can only retain Lemar Hoskins, one of the Buckies, since the other two fail to pass background checks.

Walker is partnered with Hoskins as the new Bucky but Hoskins later changes the codename to "Battlestar" due to the negative racial name connotations for a black man. The two follow Adrian Sammish's orders. Walker is trained by the Freedom Force, the Guardsmen, and the Taskmaster—Taskmaster's training focusing on teaching him how to use Captain America's shield—and goes on his first mission against the Watchdogs militia group.

Another of Walker's early acts as Captain America was a mission to "aid stability and democracy in South America" by teaming up with the Tarantula in order to hunt escaped political dissidents from his home country on behalf of its oppressive regime in order to silence them. Despite believing in the fight against Communism and in the principle of helping America's "Democratic allies in Latin America", Walker becomes increasingly uncomfortable with the methods used by Tarantula after he interrogates and threatens occupants of an immigration detention center for information on his targets. The two battle and wound Spider-Man, however Walker – increasingly conflicted by the fact that both the immigrants who Tarantula interrogated and Spider-Man looked upon him and the uniform he wore with fear, seeing him as an enemy – decides to walk away, convincing himself that this course of action was not something that Captain America would support. Spider-Man ultimately defeats Tarantula and Walker later learns that the individual who gave him his orders to help Tarantula was a rogue agent who did so without legal authority, beating him and telling him that the uniform he wears is supposed to inspire, not terrify.

Although Walker finds himself trying to emulate Rogers's ethics, Walker is more brutal than his predecessor due to his reactionary points of view. His superhuman strength and lack of emotional control lead him to inadvertently beat Professor Power to death. as well as badly injure 'The Resistants' mutant group.

Left-Winger and Right-Winger, the two rejected Buckies, crash the press conference arranged by Cooper to reveal the "new" Captain America and Battlestar, and announce Walker's name and birthplace on national TV. His parents are subsequently killed by the Watchdogs; this incident drives Walker closer to a mental breakdown, particularly when the Commission orders him not to step out of line in the future, resulting in him missing his parents' funeral due to his responsibilities. In a state of rage, he kills many of the Watchdogs, and beats Left-Winger and Right-Winger to a pulp, leaving the two to die in an explosion, and are left terribly burned and in critical condition. Walker is then captured by Flag-Smasher, but rescued by Rogers, Battlestar, and D-Man.

The Red Skull, now in a clone body of Steve Rogers, lures Walker to Washington, D.C. The Red Skull attacks Walker with a horde of Walker's enemies, but Walker kills or critically injures the enemies all in a single brawl. The Red Skull arranges for Walker to confront Rogers—now using "the Captain" identity and costume—but Rogers defeats him and confronts the Red Skull. Walker wakes up and throws his shield at the Red Skull, causing the latter to be exposed to his own "dust of death" which resulted in the supervillain's reddish skull appearance, but the Red Skull escapes. Rogers and Walker give a report to the Commission, which returns the Captain America uniform to Rogers. Rogers declines the offer, but Walker persuades Rogers to reconsider and accept it. At a press conference announcing the original Captain America's return, General Haywerth fakes Walker's assassination by a Watchdog in order to set up Walker in a new identity.

To address Walker's psychosis, he is hypnotized into believing his parents are still alive, and he would not recover his full memory for many years. He is also given a new cover identity of "Jack Daniels" as well as speech therapy and work to erase old mannerisms in order to help hide the fact that he was the man the public had recently seen "assassinated".

U.S. Agent/West Coast Avengers
Walker soon resurfaced as an adventurer known as the U.S. Agent, wearing a variation of the Captain costume and using the vibranium disc as a shield. Walker continued to work for the Commission. He was first seen as the U.S. Agent, battling an Iron Monger as a test for the Commission. He was placed as a watchdog of West Coast Avengers and the Vision by the Commission, as a condition to possibly get their government clearance reinstated. Some time later, he rescued Battlestar from the Power Broker, and reconciled with the former; Walker learned that his memories had been altered and that his parents were dead.

The manner of his appointment to the West Coast Avengers team, and his own abrasive attitude, saw U.S. Agent frequently come into conflict with his colleagues, in particular the headstrong Hawkeye (Clint Barton), which culminated in a battle between the two that saw both suspended. He later almost killed Spider-Woman (Julia Carpenter) – an ex-employee of U.S. Agent's former employers – hesitating over delivering the fatal blow before collapsing in grief – his guilt over his long history of violence catching up with him.

While under the employ of the Commission for Superhuman Activities, U.S. Agent was charged with the responsibility of taking down the Punisher. After locating the Punisher and engaging him in hand-to-hand combat, the Punisher discloses he is attempting to take down the Maggia. U.S. Agent agrees to help the Punisher, vowing to take him into custody afterwards. U.S. Agent takes down the superpowered mercenary Paladin, who had been employed by the Maggia to kill the Punisher, breaking both legs with his shield. Upon completion of the mission, the Punisher ultimately escapes U.S. Agent by dressing a deceased henchman in his uniform and leaving him in a burning building, convincing U.S. Agent that he had perished in the fire. Halfway through the resultant dressing-down by his employers, while being informed that his job is to act, not to think, and that it is no wonder he had failed as Captain America, U.S. Agent walks away.

U.S. Agent was once more forced to choose between following the rules and laws of the nation he had dedicated himself to serving, or ignoring said rules in favor of doing what he personally believed to be right, when he investigated a series of gruesome murders of illegal immigrants on the Mexico/U.S border who he later discovered were being committed by a corrupt law enforcement official.

U.S. Agent investigates the killer "the Scourge of the Underworld" and discovers that Scourge is not an individual at all, but is in fact essentially a franchise of killers trained towards the singular purpose of wiping out the menace posed by the world's various super-villains. U.S. Agent attempts to infiltrate the organization but is captured, tortured and interrogated until he is released by a masked operative who reveals himself to be none other than Mike Walker – U.S. Agent's older brother who he had long thought to have died in the Vietnam War. Mike tries to convince U.S. Agent to join the Scourge program before letting him go in order to think it over.

It is later revealed that "Mike" is not U.S. Agent's brother at all but rather a cleverly designed deception intended to lure U.S. Agent into joining the Scourge program himself. U.S. Agent decides against joining the program at which point 'Mike' – better known as 'Bloodstain' – attempts to wipe him out unsuccessfully.

Through interrogating members of the Scourge organization, Agent traces its mysterious benefactor back to a high-class estate, at which point he is revealed to be none other than Thomas Holloway – the man previously known as the World War II era hero "The Avenging Angel" – who reveals how he had set up the Scourge organization using his immense wealth after witnessing an innocent bystander killed by a criminal's bullet meant for him. Unable to continue his costumed career because of the guilt he instead decided to set up the organization to atone for his failings as a crime fighter and battle those criminals who would undermine America's moral character.

U.S. Agent and Bloodstain battle one last time, and Bloodstain is eventually dispatched by his own bullets as they deflect off U.S. Agent's shield. Thomas Holloway is subsequently arrested for his crimes and the Scourge program seemingly closed down. Later, U.S. Agent muses that just like Holloway he had done things as a hero that he feels he needs to make amends for, but promises that unlike Holloway he will find the true path to salvation.

U.S. Agent fought alongside the Avengers in several battles. After the Avengers moved to a United Nations based charter, he received only one vote (though not from himself) in the ensuing vote and consequently lost his place on the team. Even with his personality conflicts and reckless behavior, he soon proved himself worthy of being an Avenger and was able to rejoin.

During his time with the West Coast Avengers, U.S. Agent participated in the 'Infinity War' in which he was part of the team that remained on Earth to protect it against Magus' waves of superhuman doppelgangers, the 'Infinity Crusade', during which he was recruited by the Goddess along with other heroes who were susceptible, as they are either especially religious, mystically inclined, or have had a near-death experience, and Operation Galactic Storm in which he was responsible for guarding the Kree prisoners Captain Atlas and Dr. Minerva, and battled a Kree Sentry.

U.S. Agent also helped the team battle the likes of the Lethal Legion, Dr Demonicus and his Pacific Overlords, Ultron and his robotic 'bride' War Toy, the 'Night Shift', the 'Bogatyri'—a group of Russian extremists intent upon ushering in a new Cold War, 'Death Web'—a team of spider-themed villains, and Immortus.

U.S. Agent, along with fellow "replacement" heroes Thunderstrike and War Machine, was manipulated into battling the heroes who had inspired them—Captain America, Thor, and Iron Man—by the time-traveling villainess "Terminatrix", before putting their differences aside to team up against their common foe.

U.S. Agent, along with the rest of the West Coast Avengers, the Avengers, and the X-Men, participated in the 'Bloodties' crossover, during which Professor X attempted to negotiate a peace to end the civil war on the island of Genosha. U.S. Agent was charged with the responsibility of acting as bodyguard for Professor X.

Captain America sarcastically cited U.S. Agent's use of his "famous powers of composure and diplomacy" as one example of the recent failings of the West Coast Avengers when he indicated his intention to shut the team down. This provoked U.S. Agent's fury who raised his hand to strike Captain America; Iron Man stopped him and uttered, "Not now. Not ever".

During this time, U.S. Agent was featured in a Marvel UK comic called Super Soldiers, initially battling, then teaming up with American and British soldiers empowered by a variation of the drugs that created Nuke.

Force Works
When the West Coast Avengers dissolved, he dumped his U.S. Agent costume and shield into the Hudson River. Soon after, most of the then-current members of the West Coast Avengers were asked by Tony Stark to found Force Works. Initially U.S. Agent was reluctant, however Scarlet Witch later persuaded him to join, stating that she needed U.S. Agent to be the team's "backbone" and intended to run the team on tight military lines and the values of strength and dedication that Agent had shown her during their time together on the West Coast Avengers. U.S. Agent ultimately joined the new team, wearing a new costume and using an energy-based shield provided to him by Stark. Stark describes U.S. Agent as a "loose cannon", suggesting that he could have an identity problem, expressing the desire to develop a new look for him "to get U.S. Agent out of Captain America's red, white and blue shadow".

U.S. Agent travels to an isolated region of Tennessee in order to locate Hawkeye who had disappeared after the death of Mockingbird. Angry at the fact that Hawkeye had abandoned his teammates when they had desperately needed his support to avoid the dissolution of the West Coast Avengers, U.S. Agent finds him and they initially fight before eventually reconciling, at which point U.S. Agent informs Hawkeye of all the recent changes – including the formation of Force Works and the death of Wonder Man (Simon Williams).

Hawkeye vents that he has been through a lot with the loss of his wife, and that he mistrusts Tony Stark, prompting a rare showing of emotion from U.S. Agent who confesses that the death of his own parents haunts every waking moment of his life and that he more than anyone knows what it is like to live life on the outside looking in – never quite good enough for anyone – but at least he is not running and hiding from it!

The two agree to put their spat aside and sleep, with U.S. Agent telling Hawkeye that he will be taking him back in the morning regardless of any objections, however when U.S. Agent wakes Hawkeye is gone – although he leaves him a note thanking him for helping him get some things off his chest, and letting him know that he is not all bad after all.

In the spirit of forgiveness, U.S. Agent later formulates a plan to reconcile Hawkeye with the rest of his former teammates – especially Stark – by inviting him as a secret guest to the Force Works Christmas party. While Hawkeye waits alone he monitors U.S. Agent and the rest of the Force Works team via video feed as they listen to Stark issue a sincere apology for his behavior in recent times – from walking out on the West Coast Avengers team, to faking his own death and not trusting them with the truth.

Unfortunately Hawkeye only catches the part of the speech where Stark talks about Hawkeye's "loud mouthed opinions", switching the feed off before he hears Stark refer to Hawkeye as the backbone of the West Coast Avengers team, a friend, and how he misses his presence more than anything, and when U.S. Agent learns that Hawkeye has left in a temper, he wonders what on Earth could have gone wrong...

U.S. Agent remained a member throughout the team's tenure, fighting threats such as the Kree, alien parasites The Scatter, Slorenian supernatural threat Ember, Slorenia's armored protectors Black Brigade, The Mandarin, fighting alongside Australian super hero Dreamguard (Willie Walkaway) against the dream-manipulating Orphan, Slorenia's undead shock troops The Targoth and Volkhvy the Eternal One, teaming up with the Avengers against the Kree commandos Excel, intergalactic mercenary The Broker, battling Force Works' own rogue security system VIRGIL, an alternate reality version of deceased former Force Works member Wonder Man (Simon Williams), and the Serpent Society.

Heroes Return
U.S. Agent was briefly referred to as the Liegeman as it was the codename for him in the Morgan le Fay verse.

U.S. Agent briefly appears in Captain America vol. 3 during the 'American Nightmare' story arc attempting to steal an experimental jet plane. Captain America stops him, and U.S. Agent is later seen in stasis along with others affected by the villain Nightmare.

He eventually became the field leader of the Jury, a group of armored corporate vigilantes, owned by Edwin Cord, owner of Cordco. U.S. Agent again wearing his original U.S. Agent uniform and now using an eagle-shaped shield that could be directed in mid-air via remote control. The Jury's job was to take down the Thunderbolts, but they were defeated by the Thunderbolts and their new leader Hawkeye, a former Avenger teammate of Walker's. The Jury attempted to apprehend the Thunderbolts a second time, but instead the two groups joined forces together against Brute Force and the Secret Empire's soldiers.

U.S. Agent was severely beaten to near death by Protocide. Due to emergency medical procedures performed on him, he was outfitted, by S.H.I.E.L.D., with an enhancing exo-skeleton.

S.T.A.R.S
Following his recovery, he soon adopted a new costume and rejoined the Commission on Superhuman Activities, with the position at the head of the federal government's U.S. Marshal division, called S.T.A.R.S., the Superhuman Tactical Activities Response Squad. The group battled alien invaders and superhuman threats and was responsible for their imprisonment. In this role, he was placed in charge of coordinating Earth's heroes during the 'Maximum Security' crisis when Earth became a prison planet, claiming that he was needed to prevent the other heroes getting 'sidetracked' by their concern for the prisoners to ensure that their focus remained on what was best for Earth.

U.S. Agent continued to work for S.T.A.R.S as America's super human 'top cop' under the observation of Valerie Cooper. In this role his former love, and current agent of S.H.I.E.L.D, Kali Vries—who he had endured Army boot-camp with many years previously, and who had bested him in almost all physical tests—was thrust upon him as second in command. U.S. Agent was uncomfortable with Vries' appointment as she had previously jilted him, although she was still affectionate towards him. Other S.T.A.R.S agents warned Agent that Vries was playing him. Vries is later revealed to be in the employ of ambitious Senator Warkovsky and on his order places a parasite capable of allowing mind control on U.S. Agent's neck.

In their second mission together U.S. Agent and Vries teamed up to tackle a radical faction of Atlantians working with the super-villain Poundcakes (Marian Pouncey). It transpired that Pouncey was attempting to trade more of the alien parasites capable of mind control with the Atlantians. The Sub-Mariner (Namor) disrupts the battle and discovers the parasite placed on U.S. Agent's neck by Vries. Vries later attends Agent's room and attempts to seduce him, placing another parasite on him. U.S. Agent—apparently no longer in control of his own will, and despite being informed that a S.H.I.E.L.D envoy had been dispatched—then takes the duffle bag full of parasites seized by S.T.A.R.S in order to take them to his manipulator who transpires to be none other than the Power Broker (Curtis Jackson)—the man originally responsible for granting John Walker his super-human powers, whose plan is to infect the International assemblage of Heads of State with the mind-controlling parasites.

At this point Captain America (Steve Rogers), who had been revealed to be the S.H.I.E.L.D envoy responsible for collecting the parasites, along with Kali Vries, burst into the meeting between U.S. Agent and the Power Broker. Power Broker places a parasite on the neck of Senator Warkovsky intent upon influencing his address to the International assemblage of Heads of State, but is interrupted by U.S. Agent who is subsequently assaulted by Captain America intent upon stopping him. The two battle with neither of them able to gain the upper hand. Meanwhile, Vries is captured by the Power Broker who reveals that he had been attacked and left for dead by aliens during the 'Maximum Security' crisis at which point, barely alive, he had become the host for an alien which produced the mind-controlling parasites, subsequently attempting to expand its control by infecting influential individuals. Power Broker then infects Vries with a parasite. Eventually Agent manages to escape Captain Americas attentions long enough to reveal the presence of the parasite on Senator Warkovsky's neck and removes it with his energy baton. Together Cap and Agent fight off the crowd of V.I.P's (also apparently under the control of the Power Broker), escaping and then teaming up to restrain both Power Broker and Vries and removing the parasites from each of them. Dum Dum Dugan then appears on the scene to inform U.S. Agent that Vries, far from being a traitor, was actually a deep cover agent acting on behalf of S.H.I.E.L.D with the intention of gaining Senator Warkovsky's confidence and discovering who was using the parasites and attempting to take the mother-parasite into custody for study and as evidence. Agent destroys the specimen and then speculates that he didn't believe it to be alien at all but rather a product of a government genetics lab that went wrong. Dugan is suspicious by his silence and shocked when Captain America indicates that he believes U.S. Agent's accusation. U.S. Agent is later seen deep in thought, looking at a photo of himself and Vries during better times and reading a letter of apology from her for her deceptions. He later burns the photo before running out of his room after being informed that there is an assignment for him, declaring "I love this job!"

U.S. Agent is later summoned along with fellow Avengers Captain America, Thor, Jack of Hearts, Beast, Iron Man, and She-Hulk to unite against the common threat of litigation.

Accountants Janice Imperato and Max Catan (executives from the Maria Stark foundation who help fund the Avengers) intend to hold a meeting in order to maintain the Avengers tax exempt status, audit the team's finances, and review a recent case – a battle against the "Elements of Doom" which resulted in the expensive loss of an Avengers Quinjet, and widespread property damage.

U.S. Agent – stubborn as ever – claims a complete lack of knowledge of the incident as he "is a very busy man". When asked to justify his actions, U.S. Agent refuses to do so, with his response being "Forget it. They're alive right? They should be grateful!" and accused his interrogators of just wanting to drag heroes down.

U.S. Agent leaves his interviewers with one piece of advice: "I go out there to save lives. You just pay the bills. Just be good little bean counters – and pay em!"

Invaders

Walker eventually became a member of the New Invaders, wearing a Captain America-like costume, serving alongside the likes of the original Human Torch, Union Jack (Joseph Chapman), and the Blazing Skull until the team disbanded.

U.S. Agent's first task was to negotiate the release of the Blazing Skull from captivity at the hands of middle Eastern terrorists. It is revealed that U.S. Agent can speak fluent Arabic, but he is forced to exterminate the terrorists when they renege on the agreed deal.

The New Invaders then team up with Namor and his Atlantean forces in order to overthrow the government of Mazikandar – an alliance Namor agrees to because Mazikandar has been choking the seas with pollution by sinking oil tankers in an effort to control supply to the USA.

The New Invaders alongside the forces of Atlantis assault Mazikandar's government forces, scattering them and moving on to the capitol building in order to capture its head of state. Suddenly however they find themselves opposed by none other than the Avengers. U.S. Agent is confronted by Captain America, who calls him a disgrace to the uniform, instructing to take it off before he tears it off, but Walker replies that his country gave him that uniform because Rogers was not willing to do what they needed him to. Walker calls Rogers a traitor, and states that his country has given him the authority of the real Captain America, and that Rogers never understood duty to country and doing what is required to keep its shores safe. Rogers retorts that Captain America represents an ideal for all people, of all countries.

Ultimately U.S. Agent is defeated by Rogers. Mazikandar's dictator is presented to his hand picked successor, who promptly executes his predecessor on the steps of the capitol building to the surprise of both the Invaders and Avengers alike.

The murder of a man without trial causes a further schism with the Avengers, who blame the New Invaders for declaring open war on Mazikhandar. Namor responds that Mazikhandar had declared war on his nation when they decided to pollute the oceans.

U.S. Agent – captive for the time being – receives word from the Thin Man requesting a distraction, which Walker provides by breaking his bonds and aggressively approaching Captain America, growling that the New Invaders operation is sanctioned by the U.S., Britain, and Atlantis, and that the Avengers have no grounds to interfere. Hawkeye tries to cool the situation as only the hot-headed archer could by shooting U.S. Agent in the backside, prompting the now furious Walker to turn his attention from Captain America to Hawkeye.

With the two teams battling once more, Thin Man retreats to the inside of the Capitol building where he berates the new political leader for killing his predecessor and explaining that the previous leader had actually been a simulacrum – an imposter placed into that position when US Secretary of Defence Dell Rusk (secretly the Red Skull) had the real leader assassinated – and the New Invaders only agreed to help because they needed the synthetic alive.

The fighting ends when Namor announces that he has formed an alliance with Mazikhandar, and that it is now a protectorate of Atlantis thus giving the Avengers no need, and no power to remain.

Thin Man later informs the team that they have been formed to tackle a new threat – the "Axis Mundi" – a creation of the Red Skull and something born out of the ashes of Hitler's Third Reich, who have an army of assassins armed with sub-dimensional technology that gives them the ability to move instantly to wherever they wish without fear of barriers or borders and a plan to replace world leaders with synthezoids.

The U.S government, needing to counter the threat first created an elite strike force – the New Invaders – then equipped them with a battleship named The Infiltrator, capable of travelling the world unseen and armed with tactical missiles with the ability to drop entire cities into sub dimensional space.

Walker insisted on being called Captain America. Captain America (Steve Rogers), while attempting to close down the New Invaders, threatened Walker with legal action over his use of the uniform, stating that he owned the copyright to it. Walker informed Rogers that he had only taken the role in the first place because Rogers had refused the Thin Man's invitation to lead the team and that they had to show their enemies "that Captain America is not afraid to fight!"

While Walker initially proved to be unpopular with many of his new allies, he later gained their respect, in particular winning over Namor who had been a close ally of Steve Rogers. Walker saved Namor from a brainwashed and murderous Wolverine, who had been resurrected by The Hand during the "Enemy of the State" storyline. The badly injured Namor later offered Walker his personal thanks.

Civil War
In the special one-shot Civil War: Choosing Sides, Tony Stark (at this point U.S Secretary of Defense) orders U.S Agent north to Canada – vulnerable due to the death of Alpha Flight, in order to act as U.S liaison to the newly formed Omega Flight team, with an objective to stop super-powered criminals attempting to flee America's Superhuman Registration Act.

U.S. Agent reacts as expected – furiously – stating he "serves Uncle Sam, not Major Maple Leaf", and there is no way he is going to "freakin' Canada". Stark makes the case that Canada supplies the U.S with 20% of its oil, and their security is a top priority for S.H.I.E.L.D., but U.S. Agent is unimpressed and even the threat of arrest is not enough to persuade him as he storms out.

Later U.S. Agent overcomes an attack by a team of S.H.I.E.L.D. agents mind-controlled by the super villain Purple Man, but is overcome by the Purple Man himself who orders him to fall from great height after stealing his shield – something he only survives because of his advanced biology.

Eager for revenge, U.S. Agent's defeat gives Stark the leverage to finally persuade him to join Omega Flight when he reveals that the Purple Man has fled north himself.

Omega Flight
As an employee of Omega Flight, U.S. Agent is given the responsibility of training Weapon Omega (Michael Pointer).

During a mission to take down un-registered super-criminal Tentakill, Weapon Omega passes out mid-combat for unknown reasons forcing U.S. Agent to detain the criminal single handed. Weapon Omega's unusual behaviour rouses U.S. Agent's suspicions, who is later seen to be communicating covertly with an unknown source.

It later transpires that Weapon Omega is being manipulated by Omega Flight's handler Agent Brown as well as his psychologist Dr. Benning, but worse than that unregistered super-criminals are being detained, with no record being made of their detention, and their powers are being used to fuel Weapon Omega's energy absorbing power, resulting in the deaths of several of the inmates who are completely drained of life.

It is later revealed that U.S. Agent is acting on behalf of Iron Man who is monitoring Weapon Omega's progress and requires U.S. Agent to obtain the data analysis of Omega's powers as well as the details of his private consultations with Omega Flight's psychologists.

Before his departure Stark, due to his lack of knowledge that the super-villain Rap-tor had been recently detained—despite having access to all prisoner manifests—unknowingly confirms Agent's suspicions that super-villains detained by Omega Flight are not being officially recorded and that the villains are subsequently disappearing without explanation.

U.S. Agent's suspicions grow when Weapon Omega is not seen for weeks at a time. He is repeatedly told by Agent Brown that Omega is simply unwell and resting. Arachne (Julia Carpenter), acting with U.S. Agent in order to uncover the conspiracy, spies and informs him that Weapon Omega isn't resting and for some reason he is being constantly observed.

During their next training session U.S. Agent is easily besting Weapon Omega in combat when Omega's handlers increase the flow of power from the super-powered detainees. This results in Omega losing control as he manifests the various powers of numerous inmates, breaking U.S. Agent's ankle before manifesting the reptilian powers of Rap-tor, beating and lacerating U.S. Agent almost to death—an assault only stopped by the interference of Sasquatch (Walter Langkowski). U.S. Agent tries to warn Weapon Omega—who is shocked at his loss of control—that power is being fed into him via his suit, but is sedated before he is able to do so.

Weapon Omega eventually realizes that he is being manipulated and that his handlers intend to continue to use him even against his will, however this is stopped by the U.S. Agent having discharged himself from the infirmary despite his severe injuries. Dr. Benning boasts that as a fail-safe had been activated, all evidence of her manipulation of Weapon Omega had been destroyed. It is at this point that Omega reveals that one of the individuals whose powers he had absorbed had been a technopath, and that he had accessed all of Benning's confidential records and sent them to Tony Stark. Weapon Omega then exposes Benning to a glimpse of the hundreds of personalities within his being, leaving her in a vegetative state. He then vows to become a hero rather than a weapon and is last seen assisting the people of Alaska—the location where his powers had first manifested, resulting in the deaths of the original Alpha Flight team.

Mighty Avengers
During the "Dark Reign" storyline, U.S. Agent is removed from Omega Flight by Loki (disguised as the Scarlet Witch) to aid Hank Pym in defeating the reality-altering Chthon. Initially the pro-registration U.S. Agent finds himself in combat with the anti-registration Hulk and Hercules, but they later endeavor to team up against their common foe. Chthon's power is tied to Wundagore Mountain and U.S. Agent plays a part in separating him from that source by planting explosives in order to destroy it. The team ultimately defeat Chthon, and U.S. Agent quits the Omega Flight team – with their blessing – stating it was an honor to serve with them, but 'once an Avenger, always an Avenger'.

Following their victory, U.S. Agent joins the Mighty Avengers. The team is sent on various missions including saving the Infinite Avengers Mansion from becoming untethered from reality. On a mission to China investigating the Unspoken (a former king of the Inhumans), U.S. Agent is devolved by Xenogen gas which turns him into an Alpha Primitive. He attacks Captain America (James "Bucky" Barnes) while in this condition. Quicksilver convinces him to attack the Unspoken by saying "The Commies will win!" Pym later creates a new shield for U.S. Agent after his previous shield was destroyed by the Collective Man.

U.S. Agent was one of the Avengers who joined Hercules in his Assault on New Olympus. He said he believes that the Gods are just people with super powers and battled against Eris, Goddess of discord.

Following a conflict involving a Cosmic Cube-empowered Absorbing Man and the Dark Avengers, U.S. Agent is stripped of his rank by Norman Osborn.

Thunderbolts
U.S. Agent and several members of the now disbanded Mighty Avengers are called upon by Amadeus Cho during the events of Siege. Their mission is to stop Norman Osborn's Thunderbolts from stealing Odin's spear from the Asgardian armory. After engaging the Thunderbolts in battle, Nuke uses the spear to sever U.S. Agent's left arm and leg.

As thanks for his service during the siege of Asgard, John Walker is appointed the new warden of The Raft maximum security prison. The injuries he sustained during his fight with Nuke have left him wheelchair bound and using a prosthetic arm. He refuses to repair his body using more technologically advanced prostheses because he does not want to become a cyborg like the man who crippled him. Walker engaged several inmates in hand-to-hand combat during a prison riot, demonstrating that he could still hold his own despite some limitations. The warden was influential in establishing the new Thunderbolts beta team, appointing Songbird as team leader and handpicking the new candidates.

During the "Fear Itself" storyline, the Juggernaut heavily damaged the Raft before escaping, causing a prison break. This triggered a security fail-safe in one section of the jail which reversed the air supply, eventually creating a fatal vacuum. Walker set out to override the system, which could only be done in person. He was assisted by Ghost, who earned Walker's respect after protecting the lives of the ungrateful inmates. Walker also rallies other help, inmate and powered alike, to assist him in his duties throughout this crisis. Norman Osborn escapes the Raft due in part to traitors on staff (one had a shrine to Osborn), which leaves Walker under a cloud of suspicion.

Dark Avengers
In August 2012 a teaser image for the Dark Avengers displayed U.S. Agent's traditional red, white and black shield followed by the tag line 'EVIL is our only HOPE!'.

An interview with writer Jeff Parker later confirmed that John Walker would be returning to the role of U.S. Agent with the Dark Avengers but that this return would 'come at a cost.'

The Dark Avengers team are thrown into an alternate world where, while unconscious, U.S. Agent is examined by an alternate reality Hank Pym and determined to be "John Walker, ex-Marine Captain." June Covington is seemingly able to restore his lost limbs with help from this reality's version of the Venom symbiote in lobotomized form.

AXIS
During the "AXIS"' storyline, an inverted Doctor Doom recruits U.S. Agent to join his version of the Avengers in order to help fight the now-evil Avengers starting with Scarlet Witch when she invades Latveria.

Civil War II
During the "Civil War II" storyline, U.S. Agent meets with Paul Keane, president of Keane Industries, who, along with others, asks him to convince Captain America (Sam Wilson) to give up the shield and stand down. At first John declines the request, out of respect for Steve's decision to share the mantle with Sam, until they see a news report about Sam and former New Warrior Rage fighting the Americops, a private police force funded by Keane Industries. After Sam escapes from the Americops, U.S. Agent attacks him from behind knocking him out of the sky with his shield. He then tells Sam that he needs to stand down, saying that he is out of control and that he should hand over the shield. Sam refuses, acknowledging his mistakes when he assumed the mantle, and the two begin to fight, with John gaining the upper hand due to his powers. Sam defeats U.S. Agent by dragging him into a tunnel, where in the darkness the great horned owls that live in it gave him the advantage, allowing him to see through their eyes whilst Agent remains blind. It is later revealed that John never wanted to fight Sam until Steve approached him and convinced him to do so, saying that Sam has lost his way and needs to stand down. U.S. Agent was then reported missing in action on a secret mission to Syria, with a possible implication that his disappearance may have been the result of the now evil Steve Rogers's machinations.

Avengers Standoff
During the events of Avengers Standoff, U.S. Agent, in his civilian guise of John Walker, attended a black market auction on Barbuda (formally A.I.M) Island where he bid on and won the Axiom Protocols—a drive containing strategies on how to defeat every superhuman on Earth that had been derived from the encyclopedic knowledge of S.H.I.E.L.D agent Phil Coulson. Coulson, who had also been in attendance at the auction disguised as Wolverine, later retrieves the protocols by disabling Walker with knock-out gas.

Secret Empire
During the "Secret Empire" storyline, U.S. Agent appears briefly alongside the American resistance forces, including fellow former West Coast Avengers teammates Mockingbird and Tigra. Together while aiding other allied group of superhero and super-villain resistances, they battle the Superior Octopus (Otto Octavius) and the forces of Steve Rogers's Hydra organization which took over America. All-New Captain America, Ant-Man and the Winter Soldier manage to redeem Kobik and return the real Rogers back from imprisonment inside the Cosmic Cube, allowing the real Rogers (who immediately dons the classic Captain America costume) to defeat his Hydra counterpart.

He later joined a team of heroes recruited by Captain Marvel to hunt down the Punisher for his actions when he was a member of Hydra Supreme's "Secret Empire", even though the Punisher had been manipulated by Hydra and was now hunting every last one of them in revenge.

U.S. Agent, believing that the Steve Rogers who had led Hydra had been the genuine article, later confronted the real Rogers as he investigated a new spate of murders by the vigilante the Scourge of the Underworld, beating him and accusing him of manipulating him. He is stopped when Misty Knight activates a stasis beam to hold him in place, at which point Rogers explains that he did not commit the crimes U.S. Agent is accusing him of and that "someday we're going to grab a beer and I'll tell you exactly what went wrong".

Force Works 2020
U.S. Agent forms part of a new iteration of the superhero team Force Works during the "Iron Man 2020" storyline. Assembled to act as the U.S government's last, best line of defense against an uprising of robots and artificial intelligences, they are sent to the fictional South American nation of Lingares where their aircraft is shot down by local rebels. After surviving the crash landing, U.S. Agent is forced to fight off a group of rebels with the assistance of Mockingbird before rendezvousing with the rest of the team, at which point they are attacked and seemingly overwhelmed by a group of rebels infected with Deathlok technology.

While held captive with his shield confiscated, it is revealed that the Deathloks want the team for spare parts in their war against an even bigger threat, that of Ultimo. The team is rescued by War Machine and are surprised to discover that he himself had been rescued by MODOK Superior who now desires to join the team in order to add some "much-needed brain power" to their ranks.

Having no other choice but for them to work together, MODOK Superior states to Force Works his prior studies of Ultimo allowed him to make a device that will use radioactive signatures to weaken the robot. Though Lingares doesn't have enough radioactive signatures for them to harness, they will make use of the War Machine's arc reactor as MODOK Superior tells Quake to call Ultimo. She sends out tremors on Lingares, and Ultimo arrives as do the Deathloks. MODOK Superior explains the Deathloks would only target Ultimo, and tells War Machine to aim the attack towards Ultimo's head. One of the Deathloks speaks in Spanish stating for them to join Ultimo and his creator and even reveals that MODOK Superior had made them for the purpose of capturing Ultimo. Once War Machine gets a clear shot on the head, MODOK Superior reveals his true motives: to connect to Ultimo's headless body to become Ulti-MODOK. Retreating into a bunker, Mockingbird states the Poseidon Protocols will have Quake sink the island if Ultimo can't be stopped, but Quake is reluctant to do this as there are innocent lives on Lingares. As War Machine explains he has a plan that doesn't involve killing anybody, Ulti-MODOK explains he found Ultimo asleep beneath Lingares until he awoke him and had to create the Deathloks when he couldn't stop him on his own. War Machine's plan involves using a generator in the bunker to jump-start his armor's arc reactor. Once the arc reactor has been re-energized, James Rhodes has Quake distract Ulti-MODOK in the War Machine armor to buy the rest of Force Works time to figure out how to stop the Deathloks. Rhodes finds the central processor in the command unit as U.S. Agent takes down the bearded Deathlok that has it. The Deathloks are soon controlled by Rhodes who partially turned himself into a Deathlok to use the command unit. Ulti-MODOK falls into the lava in the chasm that Quake opened as the Deathloks follow him in, attacking to get him in there. Rhodes is rescued by Mockingbird and U.S. Agent as Quake closes the chasm. A day later at a secure medical facility, Maria Hill reprimands War Machine, U.S. Agent, Mockingbird, and Quake for everything they did that turned the mission into a huge fiasco. After finishing the lecture by stating she has sent out a scrub team with flamethrowers and EMP guns to destroy the evidence of what happened on Lingares, she fires them from Force Works and takes the flash drive with MODOK's Deathlok plans from U.S. Agent. The rest of the group is against Maria obtaining the Deathlok plans, until Mockingbird deduces U.S. Agent is against it as well, having given Maria an empty drive.

John Walker: U.S. Agent
A five issue mini-series written by Christopher Priest and illustrated by Georges Jeanty, John Walker: U.S. Agent sees the character fired by the government and now acting as a private security consultant. Having had his official status as U.S. Agent revoked, all of his government-issued equipment (such as his Vibranium shield) has been recalled, forcing him to make do with a series of much less damage resistant facsimiles. Whilst working a case to thwart a would-be bomber in New York, U.S. Agent encounters Morrie Watanabe before being reactivated by a low level employee of the Office of National Emergency as a joke to upset his former boss Valerie Cooper and sent to the town of Ephraim, West Virginia in order to investigate the destruction of a distribution facility by the disgruntled local population who blame it for taking employment from the towns folk. Upon their arrival they come under attack by a group of masked assailants, the leader of which is revealed to be Walker's younger sister Katie Tollifson.

It is revealed that Katie has followed in her brother's footsteps by becoming a government contractor herself and has developed a grudge against John, considering that he had forgotten about her in favor of concentrating on his career as a costumed hero. Like John, Katie had been hired to investigate the destruction of the facility which she discloses to have been a front for secret S.H.I.E.L.D activities. The destroyed facility contained specialised fuel cells, one of which has gone missing and in its damaged state is leaking a highly toxic energy that could kill everyone in the town. Additionally the fuel cells were powering a containment field around a classified subterranean asset that is now in danger of being released. U.S. Agent takes off towards the town to investigate but upon his arrival is immediately mistaken by the locals for Captain America despite his efforts to persuade them otherwise. Through his enquiries Walker concludes that the people of the town have no involvement in the disappearance of the missing fuel cell, which brings him into conflict with his sister who considers them to be "liars and bigots who reject science and reason for guns and religion" and doesn't share John's faith in what he sees as his people. Katie also reveals to John that their brother Mike, who John had always considered his personal hero and inspiration, did not die in a helicopter crash in a war zone as he had long thought, but actually committed suicide after being responsible for a fire at their childhood home that nearly resulted in the death of his two siblings. A furious Walker leaves at which point the members of Katie's team are silently killed by masked assailants led by a man who Katie passionately embraces before addressing as the new U.S. Agent.

Back at the Office of National Emergency in Washington D.C, Val Cooper attempts damage control by contacting Walker's one-time partner Battlestar to try and persuade him to drop his interest in events at Ephraim. Walker later visits Cooper to enquire about how his sister ended up working for the government to which she replies she had no involvement in recruiting her but does confirm that Walker's replacement as U.S. Agent has been sent to clean up the mess in the town, although she has no idea who the new U.S. Agent actually is. Cooper informs Walker that Katie had dyed her hair blonde when last she met her, which leads him to conclude that she must have been involved in the theft of the missing fuel cell in light of the fact her hair in now lavender - a change that he is aware can be caused by chemical waste from the fuel cell reacting with hair dye. It is also confirmed that Walker was fired/quit as U.S. Agent after he refused to follow orders to use what would have been unreasonable force to break up a peaceful protest. Elsewhere it is confirmed that Katie and the new U.S. Agent were indeed responsible for taking the missing fuel cell in order to remove the containment field around the secret asset so that they could access it for themselves. The new U.S. Agent, who refers to himself as Saint, is shown to derive his powers from periodic injections of a mysterious blue substance that also increases his height, mass, and build (as well as causing him to grow a moustache). Saint ambushes Battlestar on his way to contact Walker and the two engage in a vicious battle during which Saint criticized Battlestar for allowing himself to be a sidekick to Walker during his time as Captain America despite being more qualified than Walker for the role, also accusing him of being ashamed of his own blackness and being a living symbol of black people's complicity in their own oppression, before beating him into unconsciousness. Katie retrieves an old S.H.I.E.L.D Helicarrier that had been buried below the destroyed Ephraim facility, and Saint is shown kneeling before Morrie Watanabe and referring to him as "master" - indicating a previous connection between the two.

Saint is revealed to have been recruited and trained as part of a secret military program that Morrie had led, and obtained the title of U.S. Agent after the role was privatized and sold off. Katie is confirmed to also have super powers obtained as a result of the same injection that grants Saint his. Both Walker and Saint fear that Katie is suffering a psychosis induced by prolonged exposure to the damaged fuel cells and intends to use the retrieved helicarrier to wipe out the town of Ephraim and its people who she professes to hate. Walker makes his way to the helicarrier standing on the wing of an old crop duster plane, at which point it is revealed that the asset hidden under the destroyed facility was not the helicarrier at all but in fact a monstrous Kaiju that destroys the plane and sends Walker plummeting towards the creature.

Walker correctly surmises the Kaiju as being part of the "American Kaiju Project" - another failed attempt to create the super-soldier serum. A failure, but too potentially useful to abandon completely, the Kaiju was contained below the town of Ephraim and later provided the source of the serum used to grant Katie and Saint their powers - a serum that is revealed to be the only thing keeping Saint alive after prolonged use of it altered his DNA. On the Helicarrier, Saint, wielding the original vibranium U.S. Agent shield, confronts Katie in an attempt to stop her and save the town. Katie reveals to Saint that she considers her brother a joke, that she can do better, and that she manipulated Saint as the new U.S. agent to gain access and powers of her own that she will use to stop government lies and corporate manipulation as America's newest super patriot. The two fight and Saint uses the distraction caused by Walker steering the Kaiju into the helicarrier to stop Katie with a bullet to the head from his pistol. Landing on the helicarrier, Walker attacks Saint for his role in injuring Battlestar and indoctrinating his sister, to which Saint responds that it was Katie who manipulated him and that her motive had been to replace Walker as U.S. Agent. The helicarrier crashes and Saint drags Walker from the wreckage before collapsing due to overuse of the Kaiju serum at which point Walker retrieves the original U.S. Agent shield for himself. Later Val Cooper informs Walker that his sister survived her gunshot wound and has been moved to a psych ward for treatment. Cooper also reveals that Katie's story about their brother committing suicide was a lie and a result of her psychosis. Cooper expresses that Walker might actually be more useful without official government status, which Walker interprets as him being able to break the rules and act with impunity and without oversight, also refusing to return the shield despite it being official government property.

The United States of Captain America
Days before he was due to lend his shield to a museum exhibit, Captain America is robbed by a super-fast assailant wearing his costume. He enlists former Captain Americas Sam Wilson, Bucky Barnes, and John Walker to reclaim the stolen shield, and their pursuit leads them to the "Captains Network" - a loose collective of people protecting their communities under the mantle of Captain America. Walker is recruited by Steve Rogers in a bar having had one too many Boilermaker but he soon regains sobriety when Rogers informs him that there is a neo-fascist plot to destroy the legacy of the shield and reminds Walker that he loves his country "...more than most. Perhaps as much as I do". Together the assembled Captains past and present travel to a top secret facility where Sin, Warrior Women and a brainwashed Speed Demon are seeking to release Hate-Monger who they propose to set up as a new leader for a divided America. Walker knocks out the hypnotized Speed Demon. When Sin is captured she is confident that she will be able to resist any questioning from the likes of Rogers and his "cub scouts", that is until Walker volunteers to interrogate her, adding that he was "expelled from the cub scouts".

Sure enough Sin talks under Walkers interrogation as he reveals that he used techniques such as fear, futility, sleep adjustment, isolation, sensory deprivation, and stress positions. Captain America seems shocked at the methods used but Walker reassures him that all of the techniques are permissible under the Geneva Conventions.

Devil's Reign
It is an election year and as part of his re election campaign during the "Devil's Reign" storyline, Mayor Wilson Fisk is gunning for the superhero community, making all super-powered activity within New York City prohibited. U.S. Agent is the leader of the latest iteration of Mayor Fisk's Thunderbolts as he leads Agony, Electro II, and Rhino against Moon Knight as their first target.

His enlistment is seen when he enters Mayor Fisk's office at the time when Agony, Electro II, Rhino, Taskmaster, and Whiplash were present, introducing himself as "reporting for duty". U.S. Agent's pitch to Fisk to allow him to join the Thunderbolts is the fact that the criminals he has hired for the team are inevitably going to start playing by their own rules eventually. U.S. Agent promises to keep them on a short leash and make sure they play nice so that everyone stays safe and Fisk ends up looking good, adding "I don't walk the line. I don't cross the line. I AM the line". True to his word, U.S. Agent prevents the Thunderbolts from keeping diamonds stolen during a robbery they stop for themselves by beating each member single-handedly and promising to turn them into a team, threatening that anyone who thinks otherwise "is gonna find themselves under my boot". What Mayor Fisk does not know is that the U.S. Agent is secretly working with the FBI to find any incriminating evidence of any illegal activities that Mayor Fisk has committed while in office, although Agony has her suspicions about his motives.

U.S. Agent and the Thunderbolts were involved in attempting to seize the mutant Krakoan gate and tree house in Central Park on the orders of Mayor Fisk, but was stopped by a plan hatched by Emma Frost who had the tree house declared as a mutant embassy and so protected by the United Nations as sovereign mutant territory.

U.S. Agent and Agony would later encounter the Purple Child called Conviction who stated that Mayor Wilson Fisk kept her locked in Ravencroft to find a way to replicate her abilities. U.S. Agent would question the legality of Mayor Fisk's request for the Thunderbolts to hunt down the children of the Purple Man, but Fisk used the pheromone-based powers of persuasion derived from the thumb of the Purple Man located within his cane to compel U.S. Agent to follow his orders. 

U.S. Agent and the Thunderbolts locate the children of the Purple Man and seek to detain them, but the kids do not want to cooperate and seek to stop U.S. Agent with their mind-control powers. U.S. Agent was prepared for this eventuality however as the nearby Electro uses her powers to shock all of the occupants of the apartment into unconsciousness, with U.S. Agent being spared because of his insulated boots. Jessica Drew and the Champions attempt to stop U.S. Agent and the Thunderbolts but are unable to prevent the abduction of the Purple Children after the appearance of the Thunderbolts latest member Abomination.

During the fight between the heroes, the Thunderbolts, the Superior Four, and the mind-controlled crowd, Captain America faced off against a mind-controlled U.S. Agent and tried to get through to him.

U.S. Agent would later come face to face once more with former Avenger's teammate and adversary Hawkeye (Clint Barton) who is leading new team of Thunderbolts under the direction of newly-elected mayor Luke Cage. Hawkeye's first mission is to capture the escaped members of Wilson Fisks Thunderbolts team and he manages to take down U.S. Agent with the assistance of new Thunderbolt member Gutsen Glory who incapacitates Walker with a dozen tranqualizer darts. Later Luke Cage berates Barton because he specifically told him that U.S. Agent was working with the F.B.I as part of the police escort for Fisk's team. Barton claims not to remember Cage telling him that and that he took U.S. Agent down because "he acted like a bad guy".<ref>Thunderbolts #1 (2022)</ref>

U.S. Agent was employed to provide security at the Myrmidon high-security super-powered holding facility when it was attacked by Daredevil who, as leader of the Fist (an organization meant to challenge The Hand) infiltrates the facility in order to break out the various villains incarcerated there and offer them "salvation". Daredevil takes out the armored Guardsmen by first killing the lights before taking them down with his baton. U.S. Agent then challenges Daredevil to fight him "like a man", but Daredevil - who reminds U.S. Agent that he lead the Thunderbolts under Wilson Fisk's rule - easily beats him before leaving, taking U.S. Agent's shield with him.

Powers and abilities
As a result of the experimental mutagenic augmentation process conducted on him by Dr. Karl Malus on behalf of the Power Broker, John Walker has superhuman strength (capable of lifting 10 tons under maximum exertion), agility, reflexes and endurance. His speed, dexterity, coordination, and balance are of the order of a superior Olympic athlete.

Aside from the above advantages, U.S. Agent is an exceptional hand-to-hand combatant and highly trained in gymnastics and acrobatics, having received rigorous training in unarmed combat and the use of his shield in a style similar to Captain America's own fighting style by the Taskmaster.

He is a seasoned combat veteran with military combat experience in tactical and strategic planning, observations, and special operations, has been shown to have a fluent grasp of Arabic and Spanish, is technically proficient enough to bypass an advanced security system, is a qualified fixed-wing pilot, a trained scuba diver, and is highly proficient in the use of conventional firearms.

He is capable of using his nearly indestructible vibranium shield for defensive purposes and as a weapon. He has great accuracy at throwing his shield, and due to his superhuman strength, it is potentially a lethal weapon.

Agent has used a variety of shields in his time, initially inheriting Captain America's indestructible circular shield after Steve Rogers relinquished it upon quitting the role and refusing to work for the Commission for Super-Human Activities. U.S. Agent was later provided a vibranium replica of this shield by the Black Panther, which was also used by Steve Rogers when Rogers adopted the title of 'The Captain'. U.S. Agent then briefly adopted a remote control shield against Hawkeye and the Thunderbolts. During his time with the New Invaders, U.S. Agent possessed a star-shaped shield with retractable spikes. The shield was decorated with the names of Americans who had died at the hands of terrorists, as well as a photograph of U.S. Agent's parents.

After being badly injured by the villain Protocide, U.S. Agent was fitted with an exoskeleton by S.H.I.E.L.D. that allowed him to continue to walk, and according to then-Director Sharon Carter may have also provided "an additional benefit or two".

After being crippled by Nuke, John Walker lost one arm and one leg. Electing to use ordinary low-tech prosthesis, he retired his U.S. Agent identity, and no longer has access to his weapons and gear. However, he still retains his full capability to act in self-defense.

Equipments
At one point, the Agent used wrist guards which produced an energy shield as well as energy blasts. U.S. Agent's costume incorporated a "thought relay receptor" that picks up his mental commands and shapes his shield however he wills it. In U.S. Agent's own words "It's better than the old trash can lid!"

In his first costumed identity as the Super Patriot, Walker wore a costume that was capable of stopping multiple shots from a handgun at point-blank range, and also used throwing stars and a flame torch. The U.S. Agent also wears synthetic stretch bulletproof fabric.

Reception

 Accolades 

 In 2012, IGN ranked U.S. Agent 29th in their "Top 50 Avengers" list.
 In 2015, Entertainment Weekly ranked U.S. Agent 67th in their "Let's rank every Avenger ever" list.
 In 2018, CBR.com ranked U.S. Agent 20th in their "Shield Of Dreams: The Very Best Captain Americas" list.
 In 2020, CBR.com ranked U.S. Agent 7th in their "Marvel: Every Version Of Captain America" list.
 In 2022, Screen Rant included U.S. Agent in their "10 Most Powerful Members Of The Thunderbolts" list.
 In 2022, CBR.com ranked U.S. Agent 10th in their "Thunderbolts' 10 Best Leaders" list.

Other versions
What If?
In an alternate reality, John Walker is Captain America and battles with Steve Rogers, with only the intervention of Nick Fury and then-President Ronald Reagan bringing the hostilities to an end. Reagan gives a speech in which he enshrines the importance of helping the government against foreign enemies and in support of domestic affairs, but also the importance of America as a nation of individuals—ideologies represented by Walker and Rogers respectively. His speech is cut tragically short however when the head of the Commission, Douglas Rockwell, assassinates Rogers by shooting him dead on the orders of the Red Skull—who has secretly been planning Rogers' downfall and was close to seeing his plans fail. In light of Rogers's death, the President requests that Walker be the new Captain America. However, as it was before, Walker is lethally violent, and with Rogers not alive to stop his fury, he goes unchecked until the nation burns. Eventually, Walker is stopped and imprisoned in the Vault for his crimes, but the government—realizing that the man inside the costume was far more important than the costume itself—decides to retire the Captain America role and consign it to a museum. Later, the Red Skull visits the museum, stands below the memorial of his greatest foe—a foe now utterly destroyed and reduced to nothing but a memory—and laughs, finally triumphant.

In another dystopian alternate reality in which Steve Rogers's icy tomb was not discovered by the Avengers until much later in history, U.S. Agent is once again a villain, working for an oppressive United States government and going by the name of "American Agent".

Marvel Zombies
In one panel, U.S. Agent is shown as one of the surviving heroes. He questions why Magneto is present, to which Nick Fury answers "anyone who is not a zombie is an ally".

Ultimate Marvel
In the Ultimate Marvel version, "Major" John Walker is a high-ranking official at the Camp Angel facility used to house mutants in the aftermath of Ultimatum, appearing to be complicit in the beating and torture of some mutants. When the news breaks that all mutants are actually the result of secret government experiments, a riot breaks out at the camp led by the X-Man Storm.

SS Agent
John Walker of Earth-9907 is the deputy leader of the Thunder Guard, that Earth's feared superhuman police force. SS Agent has a costume and photonic energy shield similar to that worn and used by USAgent during his time with Force Works. He first appeared in Avengers Next #10.

Infinity Wars
During the "Infinity Wars" storyline, John Kaluu is the U.S.Archmage, a character that is the result of a combination of John Walker and the villain Kaluu and including physical features of both characters. John Kaluu was a soldier in the U.S Army who became the new soldier supreme when the original disappeared. He fought against the Communists during the Cold War, although he was dangerously out of control because of his use of dark magic and was placed into suspended animation by the military. Kaluu eventually broke out after the return of Stephen Rogers and the two would eventually form an uneasy alliance.

In other media
Marvel Cinematic Universe
John Walker appears in live-action media set in the Marvel Cinematic Universe, portrayed by Wyatt Russell. This version wields a firearm and Steve Rogers's shield, which the latter bequeathed to Sam Wilson, who in turn gave it to the government, who gave the shield to Walker. Additionally, Walker has a supportive wife named Olivia (portrayed by Gabrielle Byndloss).

 First appearing in a cameo at the end of the Disney+ miniseries The Falcon and the Winter Soldier (2021) episode "New World Order", Walker is introduced to the public as the government's chosen successor to Rogers as the new Captain America. In the episode "The Whole World Is Watching", Walker salvages a recreated Super Soldier Serum and later ingests it. After the Flag Smashers' leader, Karli Morgenthau, kills his partner Lemar Hoskins, an enraged Walker kills one of her fellow Flag Smashers in front of a horrified crowd. In the following episode "Truth", Wilson and Bucky Barnes take the shield from him, the government strips him of his role as Captain America, and discharges him from service, removing his rank and benefits permanently. Walker is later visited and recruited by Contessa Valentina Allegra de Fontaine before he visits Hoskins' family to inform them of the events leading to his death. Still enraged over his partner's death and embittered over the government's treatment of him, Walker begins building a new shield from scrap metal and his war medals. In the series finale, "One World, One People", Walker confronts and fights Morgenthau, but lets her escape after he chooses to save a van containing hostages instead. Following this, Walker assists Barnes in capturing the remaining Flag Smashers. Walker and Olivia later meet with De Fontaine again, who gives him a new suit and dubs him "U.S. Agent".
 Russell will reprise his role as Walker / U.S. Agent in the upcoming film Thunderbolts (2024).

Video games
 U.S. Agent appears as a secret playable character in Marvel Super Heroes vs. Street Fighter.
 U.S. Agent appears as an assist character in Marvel vs. Capcom: Clash of Super Heroes.
 U.S. Agent's costume is available as an alternate costume for Captain America in Marvel Ultimate Alliance.
 U.S. Agent's costume was available as an alternate costume for Captain America in Marvel Heroes.

Toys
 In 1990, ToyBiz produced a U.S. Agent action figure for their Marvel Superheroes toyline. The figure was merely a repaint of the previously released Captain America action figure.
 In 1995, ToyBiz released an action figure line for the 1994 Iron Man animated series. A U.S. Agent action figure was produced, but never made it to mass market. However, the figure eventually did get released in international markets and the odd short packed case. It became one of the more valuable figures in the line. ToyBiz did release the original version of the figure at a convention, which usually sells for 2–3 times more than that of the international release. The figure was later remolded to become Astral Armor Professor X in the X-Men toy line.
 U.S. Agent received a two-inch figure in a Marvel Minimates line two-pack with Taskmaster.
 A U.S. Agent figure in his original costume was released as part of the Comic Series segment of Hasbro's 2011 Captain America'' movie tie-in toy line.
 In 2012, Hasbro introduced a 6-inch U.S. Agent in his original costume in Wave 3 of their Return of Marvel Legends line.
 In 2021, Hasbro released a 6-inch U.S. Agent based on Wyatt Russell's portrayal of the character in The Falcon and the Winter Soldier. However it is based on concept art and is inconsistent with U.S. Agent's costume in the show proper, adding the Captain America "A" symbol on his helmet from his Captain America costume, and lacking white stripes across the chest.

Collected editions

As Captain America

As U.S.Agent

References

External links
 U.S.Agent at Marvel.com

Avengers (comics) characters
Captain America characters
Characters created by Mark Gruenwald
Characters created by Paul Neary
Comics characters introduced in 1986
Fictional amputees
Fictional characters from Georgia (U.S. state)
Fictional characters with superhuman durability or invulnerability
Fictional shield fighters
Fictional super soldiers
Incarnations of Captain America
Marvel Comics characters with superhuman strength
Marvel Comics martial artists
Marvel Comics military personnel
Marvel Comics mutates
Marvel Comics superheroes
Marvel Comics titles
United States-themed superheroes